Carroll County Public Schools may refer to:

 Carroll County Public Schools (Kentucky)
 Carroll County Public Schools (Maryland)
 Carroll County Public Schools (Virginia), see 
 Carroll County School District (Georgia)
 Carroll County School District (Mississippi)